The 2021 LTP Charleston Pro Tennis was a professional women's tennis tournament played on outdoor clay courts. It was the fifth edition of the tournament which is part of the 2021 ITF Women's World Tennis Tour. It took place in Charleston, South Carolina, United States between 3 and 9 May 2021.

Singles main-draw entrants

Seeds

 1 Rankings are as of 26 April 2021.

Other entrants
The following players received wildcards into the singles main draw:
  Caty McNally
  Alycia Parks
  Kennedy Shaffer
  Katie Volynets

The following player received entry as a special exempt:
  Claire Liu

The following players received entry from the qualifying draw:
  Amina Anshba
  Victoria Duval
  Arianne Hartono
  Eri Hozumi
  Aleksandra Krunić
  Jamie Loeb
  Urszula Radwańska
  Aldila Sutjiadi

Champions

Singles

 Claire Liu def.  Madison Brengle, 6–2, 7–6(8–6)

Doubles

 Caty McNally /  Storm Sanders def.  Eri Hozumi /  Miyu Kato 7–5, 4–6, [10–6]

References

External links
 2021 LTP Charleston Pro Tennis at ITFtennis.com
 Official website 

2021 ITF Women's World Tennis Tour
2021 in American tennis
May 2021 sports events in the United States
LTP Charleston Pro Tennis
2021 in American women's sports